Alexander Nikolayevich Svitov (born 3 November 1982) is a Russian professional ice hockey forward currently an unrestricted free agent. He most recently played with Lokomotiv Yaroslavl of the Kontinental Hockey League (KHL).

Playing career

Svitov was drafted in the first round, third overall, by the Tampa Bay Lightning in the 2001 NHL Entry Draft.

He made his National Hockey League (NHL) debut with the Lightning in the 2002–03 season, appearing in 63 games and recording eight points. During the 2003–04 season, he was traded to the Columbus Blue Jackets in exchange for Darryl Sydor.

During the 2005–06 season, Svitov returned to Russia and played for his hometown, Avangard Omsk, in the Russian Superleague (RSL). In the following 2006–07 season, Svitov returned to the Blue Jackets and played in a career high 76 games, scoring 18 points.

On 17 August 2007, Svitov effectively ended his NHL career in signing a three-year contract with Avangard Omsk, after signing a two-year contract with the Blue Jackets on 2 July.

After a three season stint with Salavat Yulaev Ufa, Svitov moved to Ak Bars Kazan as a free agent in the 2013–14 season. Svitov Captained Ak Bars in 5 of his 6 seasons with the club, winning the Gagarin Cup in the 2017–18 season.

On 15 June 2019, Svitov extended his professional career, agreeing to a one-year contract as a free agent with Lokomotiv Yaroslavl.

International play
Svitov is IIHF World U20 Championship all-time statistical leader in penalty minutes with 101 minutes in 11 games.

Career statistics

Regular season and playoffs

International

Awards and honours

References

External links

1982 births
Living people
Ak Bars Kazan players
Avangard Omsk players
Columbus Blue Jackets players
Hamilton Bulldogs (AHL) players
Lokomotiv Yaroslavl players
National Hockey League first-round draft picks
Ice hockey players at the 2014 Winter Olympics
Olympic ice hockey players of Russia
Sportspeople from Omsk
Russian ice hockey centres
Salavat Yulaev Ufa players
Syracuse Crunch players
Springfield Falcons players
Tampa Bay Lightning draft picks
Tampa Bay Lightning players